A Beta-3 adrenergic antagonist (β3-adrenoceptor antagonist) is an adrenergic antagonist which blocks the Beta-3 adrenergic receptors of cells, with either high specificity (an antagonist which is selective for β3 adrenoceptors) like L-748,328, L-748,337 and SR 59,230A or non-specifically (an antagonist for β3 and for β1 or β2 adrenoceptors) like the non-selective betablocker Carvedilol.

See also
 SR 59230A
 Carvedilol
 Betablocker
 Beta-3 adrenergic receptor

References 

Beta blockers